Cyclone Raymond is the seventh studio album by Australian pop rock band Mental As Anything, released in September 1989 and peaked at number 34 on the ARIA Charts.

Track listing

Personnel

Musicians
 Martin Plaza — lead vocals, guitar    
 Greedy Smith — lead vocals, keyboards, harmonica
 Reg Mombassa — guitar, vocals  
 Peter O'Doherty — bass, guitar, vocals 
 Wayne de Lisle – drums

Charts

References 

1989 albums
Mental As Anything albums
albums produced by Mark Opitz
CBS Records albums